Wang Weiping (born 21 March 1966) is a Chinese boxer. He competed in the men's flyweight event at the 1988 Summer Olympics.

References

1966 births
Living people
Chinese male boxers
Olympic boxers of China
Boxers at the 1988 Summer Olympics
Place of birth missing (living people)
Flyweight boxers
20th-century Chinese people